Abbuzze! Der Badesalz-Film is a German film starring the comedy duo Badesalz, directed by Roland Willaert. It was released in 1996.

Reception
The film was the sixth most popular German film for the year with admissions of 716,839.

References

External links
 

1996 films
1996 comedy films
German comedy films
1990s German-language films
1990s German films